Nematidium is a genus of cylindrical bark beetles in the family Zopheridae. There are at least three described species in Nematidium.

Species
These three species belong to the genus Nematidium:
 Nematidium constrictum Dajoz, 1984
 Nematidium filiforme LeConte, 1863
 Nematidium mustela Pascoe, 1863

References

Further reading

 
 
 

Zopheridae
Articles created by Qbugbot